Remi Dujardin (born 23 June 1997) is a Hong Kong professional footballer who plays as a defensive midfielder for Hong Kong Premier League club Sham Shui Po.

College career
In April 2016, Dujardin signed for National Premier Soccer League club Rochester River Dogz. Meanwhile, he also played college soccer for St. Bonaventure Bonnies in NCAA Division I.

Club career
In January 2019, after graduating from college, Dujardin turned professional and signed for Segunda División B club Jumilla. He also played for Tercera División club Estudiantes de Murcia, the reserve team of Jumilla.

In September 2020, Dujardin signed for Kategoria Superiore club Skënderbeu after trialing for Veikkausliiga club HIFK few months ago.

In August 2021, Dujardin joined another Kategoria Superiore club Egnatia.

On 8 August 2022, Dujardin returned to Hong Kong and signed for Hong Kong Premier League club Sham Shui Po.

International career
Dujardin has represented Hong Kong internationally on the youth level, being a regular team member of Hong Kong U-23 from 2017 to 2019.

Personal life
Dujardin is the elder brother of another professional football player Alexandre Dujardin, who is currently playing for HKFC.

References

External links
 
 

1997 births
Living people
Hong Kong footballers
Hong Kong expatriate footballers
Hong Kong youth international footballers
Hong Kong people of French descent
Hong Kong people of Taiwanese descent 
Association football midfielders
Association football defenders
Expatriate footballers in Albania
Expatriate footballers in Spain
Hong Kong expatriate sportspeople in Spain
Expatriate soccer players in the United States
Segunda División B players
Tercera División players
Kategoria Superiore players
Hong Kong Premier League players
FC Jumilla players
KF Skënderbeu Korçë players
Sham Shui Po SA players
St. Bonaventure Bonnies men's soccer players